The Alavian Dam and Lake is situated on the Soofian Chay river in East Azerbaijan Province, north-western Iran. It is located about 3 kilometres north of Maraqeh. It is an earth-fill embankment dam with a height of 76 metres and was built between 1990 and 1995; opening on January 1, 1996. The dam serves to provide flood control and water supply for municipal and irrigation uses. After construction, it was noticed that the dam had settled five times more than expected. The settlement of the dam and its gallery, below the body, had unexpected differences as well. This led to "considerable" leakage in the gallery.

References

Lakes of Iran
Buildings and structures in East Azerbaijan Province
Earth-filled dams
Dams completed in 1996
Dams in East Azerbaijan Province